The 1992 Botswana Premier League, also known as the 1992 Castle Super League for sponsorship reasons, was the 26th season of the Botswana Premier League. It was the first to feature 12 teams, an improvement from the 10 teams of the previous season.

Season summary
Extension Gunners, then known as LCS Gunners due to sponsorship by Lobatse Cash Stores, topped the log to win their first title ahead of much fancied teams including defending champion BDF XI. Gunners would also win the FA Cup to mark their league victory as more than just a fluke.

League table

References

Botswana Premier League
Botswana